This is a list of senior officers of the British Army.  See also Commander in Chief of the Forces, Chief of the General Staff, and Chief of the Imperial General Staff.

Captains-General of the British Army, 1707–1809
See article on Captain general

Commanders-in-Chief of the Forces, 1660–1904
See article on Commander-in-Chief of the Forces

Chiefs of the General Staff, 1904–1909

See article on Chief of the General Staff (United Kingdom)

Chiefs of the Imperial General Staff 1909–1964

See article on Chief of the General Staff (United Kingdom)

Chiefs of the General Staff, 1964– 

See article on Chief of the General Staff (United Kingdom)

Vice Chiefs of the Imperial General Staff

See article on Vice Chief of the General Staff (United Kingdom)

Deputy Chiefs of the Imperial General Staff

See article on Deputy Chief of the General Staff (United Kingdom)

Assistant Chiefs of the General Staff

See article on Assistant Chief of the General Staff (United Kingdom)

Adjutant-general to the Forces / Commander Home Command

See article on Adjutant-General to the Forces (Commander Home Command since 2016).

Quartermaster-General to the Forces / Chief of Materiel (Land)

See article on Quartermaster-General to the Forces

Master-General of the Ordnance, 1415-2013

See article on Master-General of the Ordnance

Commander-in-Chief, UK Land Forces/UK Land Command/Land Forces
See article on Commander-in-Chief, Land Forces (Commander since 2011, Commander Field Army since 2016)

(Deputy) Commander(-in-Chief), UK Land Forces/Field Army
See article on Deputy Commander Field Army

Commander of Regional Forces, 2002-2009
See article on Commander Regional Forces

See also
List of field marshals of the British Army
List of British Army full generals
List of British generals and brigadiers

References
Footnotes

Other information
 Regiments website

Officers
British field marshals